Shernborne is a civil parish in the English county of Norfolk.
The population remained less than 100 at the 2011 Census and is included in the civil parish of Ingoldisthorpe.
For the purposes of local government, it falls within the district of King's Lynn and West Norfolk.

The villages name means 'dung stream'.

Together with the villages of West Newton, Flitcham, and Anmer, it is part of the Royal Sandringham Estate.  The village club was shut by the Sandringham Estate but is now about to become a Wood burning stove showroom.

Notes 

http://kepn.nottingham.ac.uk/map/place/Norfolk/Shernborne

External links

Villages in Norfolk
King's Lynn and West Norfolk
Civil parishes in Norfolk